Byadrangiin Lkhagvasüren is a Mongolian archer, Executive Director of Deposit Insurance Corporation of Mongolia and Vice President of Mongolian Banking Association.

He competed for Mongolia in Archery at the 2006 Asian Games. Byadan finished the 2006 Asian Games with a total of 1084 points compared to the 1332 points of South Korean Im Dong Hyun.

References

Mongolian male archers
Year of birth missing (living people)
Living people
Archers at the 2006 Asian Games
Asian Games competitors for Mongolia